Wadgaon Kh is a village in the Karmala taluka of Solapur district in Maharashtra state, India.

Demographics
Covering  and comprising 169 households at the time of the 2011 census of India, Wadgaon Kh had a population of 762. There were 399 males and 363 females, with 104 people being aged six or younger.

References

Villages in Karmala taluka